Bicester North  is a station on the Chiltern Main Line, one of two stations serving Bicester in Oxfordshire.

Bicester North is one of Bicester's two stations.

History
The 'Bicester cut-off' between Ashendon Junction and Aynho Junction was opened in 1910 - the final main-line stretch of route to be completed in Britain until the 1980s. This provided a shortening of the London-to-Birmingham GWR main rail line, and also gave Bicester a station with direct London trains for the first time.

The station was transferred from the Western Region of British Rail to the London Midland Region on 24 March 1974.

Services
The Monday - Friday off-peak service consists of:

1 train per hour to 
1 train per hour to 

Additional services run at peak hours, and other timetabled services run at weekends.

Improvement works
In 2010 the down line through the station was realigned for higher speeds, as part of the Evergreen 3 project. In 2011, the up (southbound) platform was widened, using the trackbed of the former through lines.

Operator and routes

References

External links

Railway stations in Oxfordshire
DfT Category D stations
Former Great Western Railway stations
Railway stations in Great Britain opened in 1910
Railway stations served by Chiltern Railways
Bicester